Yahya Adl (also romanized as Yahyā ’Adl; 1908 – February 3, 2003) was a prominent Iranian surgeon, known as "Professor Adl". He is honored as the  Father of Modern Surgery in Iran.

See also
 Adl (family)

Notes

References
 THE EVOLUTION OF MODERN PEDIATRICS AS A SPECIALTY IN IRAN
 Professor Yahya Adl, the father of modern surgery in Iran
 Yahya Adl
 Yahya Adl

Physicians from Tabriz
2003 deaths
1908 births
Iranian surgeons
People's Party (Iran) Secretaries-General
20th-century surgeons
Adl family
20th-century Iranian politicians
Politicians from Tabriz